The 2000 Australian Touring Car season was the 41st year of touring car racing in Australia since the first runnings of the Australian Touring Car Championship and the fore-runner of the present day Bathurst 1000, the Armstrong 500.

Two major touring car categories raced in Australia during 2000, V8 Supercar and Super Touring. Between them there were 25 touring car race meetings held during 2000; a thirteen-round series for V8 Supercars, the 2000 Shell Championship Series (SCS), two of them endurance races; a five-round second tier V8 Supercar series 2000 Konica V8 Lites Series (KLS), an eight-round series for Super Touring, the 2000/2001 Australian Super Touring Championship (ASTC), which spilled several weeks into 2001; and V8 Supercar support programme events at the 2000 Australian Grand Prix and 2000 Honda Indy 300.

Results and standings

Race calendar
The 2000 Australian touring car season consisted of 28 events.

Shell Championship Series

Hot Wheels V8 Supercar Showdown
This meeting was a support event of the 2000 Australian Grand Prix.

Konica V8 Lites Series

Australian Super Touring Championship

FAI V8 Supercar Challenge
This meeting was a support event of the 2000 Honda Indy 300.

References

Additional references can be found in linked event/series reports.

External links
 Official V8 Supercar site
 2000 Racing Results Archive
 2001 Racing Results Archive

Supercar seasons
Touring Cars